Senftenbach is a community in Upper Austria in the district of Ried im Innkreis.

Geography
Senftenbach lies 414 meters above sea level. North to south, it is 3.3 km. From east to west, it is 5 km. The total area is 9.8 km². 19.4% of the area is wooded, while 73.5% of it is used for agriculture. The meaning of the name Senftenbach is "gentle brook", referring to Senftenbach Brook.

References

Cities and towns in Ried im Innkreis District